The Argentine marked gecko (Homonota whitii) is a species of lizard in the family Phyllodactylidae. The species is endemic to Argentina.

Etymology
The specific name, whitii, is in honor of naturalist Ernest William White (1858–1884) who collected the holotype.

Geographic range
H. whitii is found in northwestern Argentina, in the provinces of Catamarca, Córdoba, La Rioja, Mendoza, Salta, and Tucumán.

Habitat
The preferred natural habitat of H. whitii is forest.

Reproduction
H. whitii is oviparous.

References

Further reading
Avila LJ, Martinez LE, Morando M (2013). "Checklist of lizards and amphisbaenians of Argentina: an update". Zootaxa 3616 (3): 201–238.
Boulenger GA (1885). Catalogue of the Lizards in the British Museum (Natural History). Second Edition. Volume I. Geckonidæ, Eublepharidæ, Uroplatidæ, Pygopodidæ, Agamidæ. London: Trustees of the British Museum (Natural History). (Taylor and Francis, printers). xii + 436 pp. + Plates I–XXXII. (Homonota whitii, new species, p. 22 + Plate III, figures 6, 6a).
Koslowsky J (1895). "Batracios y reptiles de Rioja y Catamarca (República Argentina) recogidos durante los meses de Febrero á Mayo de 1895 (Expedicion del Director del Museo)". Revista del Museo de la Plata 6: 359–370 + Plates I–IV. ("Homonota Whitei ", p. 362). (in Spanish).
Rösler H (2000). "Kommentierte Liste der rezent, subrezent und fossil bekannten Geckotaxa (Reptilia: Gekkonomorpha)". Gekkota 2: 28–153. (Homonota whitii, p. 89). (in German).

Homonota
Reptiles of Argentina
Endemic fauna of Argentina
Reptiles described in 1885
Taxa named by George Albert Boulenger